Andrew William John McCrorie-Shand (born 14 May 1955) is a British composer. He is mostly known for having composed musical scores for children's television programmes, including the original theme tune for Teletubbies, and also the chart topping hit that followed it, Teletubbies say "Eh-oh!". McCrorie-Shand has also composed the music for Rosie and Jim, Brum and Tots TV.

Biography
He was born in Cheltenham, Gloucestershire into a musical family and taught to play piano from age 5. McCrorie-Shand joined the mid-1970s progressive rock band Druid as the keyboardist for the band's two studio albums on EMI Records. He later worked with other performers of the era such as Curved Air, Leo Sayer, Sally Oldfield, Billy Ocean and Sarah Brightman.

McCrorie-Shand was later looked upon by the children's production company Ragdoll Productions and chosen to work on TV shows such as Teletubbies, Brum, Tots TV, Boohbah, Rosie and Jim, The Adventures of Abney & Teal, Twirlywoos, B.O.T. and the Beasties.

McCrorie Shand composed music for Carrie and David's Popshop.

McCrorie-Shand appeared in the Rosie and Jim episode "Recording Studio" with Druid bass guitarist Neil Brewer.

He has not returned for the remake of Teletubbies, although the new show features orchestral versions of his original theme.

References

External links

1955 births
Living people
English composers
People from Cheltenham
Musicians from Gloucestershire
20th-century composers
20th-century British composers
21st-century composers
21st-century British composers